UAU may refer to:

 British Universities and Colleges Sport, Universities Athletic Union
 Uttarakhand Ayurved University, a state health sciences university in Uttarakhand, India
 A codon for the amino acid tyrosine